The 1979 Oklahoma Sooners football team represented the University of Oklahoma in the college football 1979 NCAA Division I-A season.  Oklahoma Sooners football participated in the former Big Eight Conference at that time and played its home games in Gaylord Family Oklahoma Memorial Stadium where it has played its home games since 1923.  The team posted an 11–1 overall record and a 7–0 conference record to earn the Conference title outright under head coach Barry Switzer who took the helm in 1973. This was Switzer's seventh conference title and fourth undefeated conference record in seven seasons.

The team was led by All-Americans Billy Sims and George Cumby. After winning the conference title outright, it earned a trip to the Orange Bowl for a bout with Florida State.  During the season, it faced three different ranked opponents (In order, #4 Texas, #3 Nebraska and #4 Florida State).  All three of these opponents finished the season ranked.  It endured its only defeat of the season against Texas in the Red River Shootout.  The Sooners started the season with a four consecutive wins before losing to Texas and then won their remaining seven games. Sims and J.C. Watts both posted for 100-yard games in the Orange Bowl.

Sims led the nation in scoring with 138 points (based on per game average of 12.0, which includes 132 in 11 games). Sims led the team in rushing with 1670 yards, Watts led the team in passing with 821 yards, Freddie Nixon led the team in receiving with 293 yards, Cumby led the team with 160 tackles and Bud Hebert posted 4 interceptions.  Billy Sims set numerous Oklahoma offensive records that still stand including career 200-yard games, single-season rushing touchdowns (tied)

Schedule

Personnel

Season summary

Iowa

Tulsa

at Rice

Colorado

Oklahoma faced its former coach Chuck Fairbanks for the first time since his departure following the 1972 season.

vs Texas

at Kansas State

Iowa State

at Oklahoma State (Bedlam Series)

Kansas

at Missouri

Oklahoma's 100th win of the 1970s (Alabama only other school to do so)

Nebraska

Orange Bowl (vs Florida State)

Rankings

Awards and honors
All-American: Billy Sims, and George Cumby,
Big 8 rushing champion: Sims
NCAA DI scoring champion: Sims
Big 8 Defensive Player of the Year: Cumby

1980 NFL Draft

The following players were drafted into the National Football League following the season.

References

External links
1979 season at SoonerStats.com

Oklahoma
Oklahoma Sooners football seasons
Big Eight Conference football champion seasons
Orange Bowl champion seasons
Oklahoma Sooners football